The 21st Annual British Academy Television Craft Awards are presented by the British Academy of Film and Television Arts (BAFTA) and were held on 17 July 2020.

Winners and nominees
Winners will be listed first and highlighted in boldface.

See also
2020 British Academy Television Awards

References

External links
British Academy Craft Awards official website

2020 television awards
2019 in British television
July 2020 events in the United Kingdom
2020
2020 awards in the United Kingdom